Rudolf Sieczyński (February 23, 1879, Vienna – May 5, 1952, Vienna) was an Austrian composer of Polish ancestry.  His fame today rests almost exclusively on the nostalgic Viennese song Wien, du Stadt meiner Träume (Vienna, City of My Dreams), whose melody and lyrics he wrote in 1914.   A well-known recording was made in 1957 by Elisabeth Schwarzkopf with Otto Ackermann conducting the Philharmonia Orchestra.  The song was featured in the soundtrack of the Stanley Kubrick film Eyes Wide Shut.

External links 
 German lyrics of selected songs, with English translation
 

1879 births
1952 deaths
19th-century classical composers
19th-century male musicians
20th-century classical composers
20th-century male musicians
Austrian male classical composers
Austrian Romantic composers
Musicians from Vienna
Musicians from Vilnius
Polish Austro-Hungarians
Polish male classical composers
Polish Romantic composers
Composers from Vienna
Wienerlied